United States v. Lee, 455 U.S. 252 (1982), was a United States Supreme Court case establishing precedent regarding the limits of free exercise of religious conscience by employers.

Background
The appellant, an Amish employer, sued the Federal Government of the United States following an assessment for unpaid Social Security taxes, claiming that the imposition of such taxes violated his freedom of conscience. The District Court had found in favor of the appellant.

Ruling
Chief Justice Warren Burger delivered the opinion of the Court, with Justices Brennan, White, Marshall, Blackmun, Powell, Rehnquist, and O'Connor, joining, and Justice Stevens separately concurring.

The Court's opinion held that the tax imposed on employers to support the social security system must be uniformly applicable to all, except if the United States Congress explicitly provides otherwise. The Court's majority opinion explained its reasoning:

Use as precedent
Lee was cited during oral arguments in Burwell v. Hobby Lobby (2014), a case about how the contraception requirement in the Patient Protection and Affordable Care Act affected closely held for-profit corporations.

See also
Religious Freedom Restoration Act

References

Further reading

External links
 

1982 in religion
1982 in United States case law
Freedom of religion in the United States
Social Security lawsuits
United States Supreme Court cases
United States Supreme Court cases of the Burger Court